This article provides information on candidates for the 2013 Australian federal election held on 7 September 2013. There were 1,717 candidates in total (1,188 for the House of Representatives and 529 for contested Senate seats).

Redistributions
Redistributions of electoral boundaries occurred in Victoria and South Australia:
Although draft electoral boundaries released during the 2010 election campaign indicated significant changes would take place in the redistribution in 2011, the Redistribution Committee restarted the process and the final boundaries made minor changes only.
Changes were minor in South Australia: no divisions changed names, the state's entitlement of 11 seats in the House of Representatives remained, and the redrawn boundaries resulted in no notional change of party.

Retiring Members

Labor
Greg Combet MP (Charlton, NSW) – announced retirement 29 June 2013
Simon Crean MP (Hotham, Vic) – announced retirement 1 July 2013
 Craig Emerson MP (Rankin, Qld) – announced retirement 26 June 2013
 Martin Ferguson MP (Batman, Vic) – announced retirement 29 May 2013
 Peter Garrett MP (Kingsford Smith, NSW) – announced retirement 26 June 2013 
 Steve Gibbons MP (Bendigo, Vic) – announced retirement 29 August 2011
 Julia Gillard MP (Lalor, Vic) – announced retirement 26 June 2013
 Sharon Grierson MP (Newcastle, NSW) – announced retirement 18 July 2012
 Harry Jenkins MP (Scullin, Vic) – announced retirement 26 July 2012
Kirsten Livermore MP (Capricornia, Qld) – announced retirement 27 November 2012
 Robert McClelland MP (Barton, NSW) – announced retirement 29 January 2013
 Nicola Roxon MP (Gellibrand, Vic) – announced retirement 2 February 2013
 Stephen Smith MP (Perth, WA) – announced retirement 27 June 2013
 Senator Mark Bishop (WA) – announced retirement 15 April 2013
 Senator Trish Crossin (NT) – confirmed she will not be standing after losing preselection 28 January 2013
 Senator John Hogg (Qld) – announced retirement 10 August 2012

Liberal
 Joanna Gash MP (Gilmore, NSW) – announced retirement 25 January 2012
 Barry Haase MP (Durack, WA) – announced retirement 15 June 2013
 Judi Moylan MP (Pearce, WA) – announced retirement 28 July 2011
 Alby Schultz MP (Hume, NSW) – announced retirement 17 April 2012
 Patrick Secker MP (Barker, SA) – announced retirement on 25 June 2013
 Mal Washer MP (Moore, WA) – announced retirement 28 July 2011
 Senator Alan Eggleston (WA) – announced retirement 9 April 2012
 Senator Gary Humphries (ACT) – lost preselection 23 February 2013; announced retirement 26 June 2013

LNP
 Paul Neville MP (Hinkler, Qld) − announced retirement 10 October 2012
 Alex Somlyay MP (Fairfax, Qld) – announced retirement 25 September 2010
 Senator Ron Boswell (Qld) – announced retirement 21 September 2012
 Senator Sue Boyce (Qld) – announced retirement 8 October 2012

National
 Tony Crook MP (O'Connor) – announced retirement 9 April 2013
 John Forrest MP (Mallee, Vic) – announced retirement 6 March 2013

Independent
 Rob Oakeshott MP (Lyne, NSW) – announced retirement 26 June 2013
 Tony Windsor MP (New England, NSW) – announced retirement 26 June 2013

House of Representatives
Sitting members are listed in bold text. Successful candidates are highlighted in the relevant colour. Where there is possible confusion, an asterisk (*) is also used.

Australian Capital Territory

New South Wales

Northern Territory

Queensland

South Australia

Tasmania

Victoria

Western Australia

Senate
Sitting senators are listed in bold. Tickets that elected at least one Senator are highlighted in the relevant colour. Successful candidates are identified by an asterisk (*).

Australian Capital Territory
Two Senate places were up for election. The Labor Party was defending one seat. The Liberal Party was defending one seat.

New South Wales
Six Senate places were up for election. The Labor Party was defending three seats. The Liberal-National Coalition was defending three seats. Senators Sam Dastyari (Labor), John Faulkner (Labor), Concetta Fierravanti-Wells (Liberal), Bill Heffernan (Liberal), Fiona Nash (National) and Lee Rhiannon (Greens) were not up for re-election.

Northern Territory
Two Senate places were up for election. The Labor Party was defending one seat. The Country Liberal Party was defending one seat.

Queensland

Six Senate places were up for election. The Labor Party was defending three seats. The Liberal National Party was defending three seats. Senators George Brandis (Liberal National), Joe Ludwig (Labor), Brett Mason (Liberal National), Jan McLucas (Labor) and Larissa Waters (Greens) were not up for re-election. The seat held by Senator Barnaby Joyce (Liberal National) was also not up for re-election but was vacant due to his resignation to contest the House of Representatives.

South Australia
Six Senate places were up for election. The Labor Party was defending two seats. The Liberal Party was defending two seats. The Greens were defending one seat. Independent Senator Nick Xenophon was defending one seat. Senators Sean Edwards (Liberal), David Fawcett (Liberal), Alex Gallacher (Labor), Anne McEwen (Labor), Anne Ruston (Liberal) and Penny Wright (Greens) were not up for re-election.

Tasmania
Six Senate places were up for election. The Labor Party was defending three seats. The Liberal Party was defending two seats. The Australian Greens were defending one seat. Senators Eric Abetz (Liberal), Christine Milne (Greens), Stephen Parry (Liberal), Helen Polley (Labor), Lisa Singh (Labor) and Anne Urquhart (Labor) were not up for re-election.

Victoria
Six Senate places are up for election. The Labor Party was defending three seats. The Liberal-National Coalition was defending three seats. Senators Kim Carr (Labor), Stephen Conroy (Labor), Richard Di Natale (Greens), John Madigan (Democratic Labour), Bridget McKenzie (National) and Michael Ronaldson (Liberal) were not up for re-election.

Western Australia
Six Senate places were up for election. The Labor Party was defending two seats. The Liberal Party was defending three seats. The Greens were defending one seat. Senators Chris Back (Liberal), Mathias Cormann (Liberal), Sue Lines (Labor), Rachel Siewert (Greens), Dean Smith (Liberal) and Glenn Sterle (Labor) were not up for re-election.

The Senate election in Western Australia was voided by the Court of Disputed Returns after the Australian Electoral Commission lost 1,375 ballot papers during an official recount. The initially elected candidates below were declared to have not been elected, and a 2014 special election was held as a result.

Summary by party 
Beside each party is the number of seats contested by that party in the House of Representatives for each state, as well as an indication of whether the party contested the Senate election in the respective state.

Unregistered parties and groups
The Socialist Party endorsed Anthony Main in Melbourne (Vic).
The 21st Century Australia Party endorsed Jamie McIntyre in New England (NSW).
The Progressive Labour Party endorsed Susanna Scurry in Newcastle (NSW).

Former candidates

Labor
Trevor Drake: originally preselected candidate for Labor-held Dobell (NSW). He was not endorsed by the central executive and withdrew his nomination in August.
Des Hardman: originally preselected candidate for LNP-held Forde (Qld).
Geoff Lake: originally preselected candidate for Labor-held Hotham (Vic). Lake was disendorsed in August 2013 after revelations of a tirade eleven years previously against a wheelchair-bound fellow councillor.
Ken Robertson: originally preselected candidate for Independent-held Kennedy (Qld). Robertson withdrew after a furore surrounding comments in which he called Opposition Leader Tony Abbott a racist and a supporter of the White Australia policy.
Jeff Salvestro-Martin: originally preselected candidate for Liberal-held Bennelong (NSW). Salvestro-Martin was disendorsed in June 2013 when he was called before the Independent Commission Against Corruption regarding undisclosed political donations.

Liberal
Michael Burr: originally preselected candidate for Labor-held Braddon (Tas). Burr withdrew in July 2012 due to ill health.
Ben Collier: originally preselected candidate for Labor-held McEwen (Vic). Collier withdrew on 4 April 2013 to spend more time with his family.
Anne Ruston: originally preselected as the third candidate on the South Australian Liberal ticket. Ruston was instead appointed to the Senate on 5 September 2012 to fill the vacancy caused by Mary Jo Fisher's resignation, and thus assumed a long-term vacancy that will not expire until 2017.
Jeff Shelley: originally preselected candidate for Labor-held Isaacs (Vic). Shelley was replaced by Garry Spencer in February 2013, citing personal reasons.

National
Nick Cleary: originally preselected for Labor-held Throsby (NSW). Cleary withdrew to spend more time with his family.
James De Barro: originally preselected for Liberal-held Barker (SA). De Barro withdrew in late May due to family circumstances.
Richard Torbay: originally preselected for independent-held New England (NSW). Torbay withdrew and resigned from the party in March 2013 over his ties to former Labor powerbroker Eddie Obeid.

Greens
Mehreen Faruqi: originally preselected for the third position on the Greens' New South Wales Senate ticket. Faruqi was instead preselected for the casual vacancy caused by current Greens MLC Cate Faehrmann's resignation to run for the Senate.
Jim McDonald: originally preselected for LNP-held Fairfax (Qld). He resigned in May following irregularities with his local party membership.
Debbie Robertson: originally preselected for Labor-held Chifley (NSW). Robertson withdrew for family reasons.

Palmer United Party
Roland Abrahams: originally preselected for Labor-held Wills (Vic).
Mark Bryant: originally preselected for Labor-held Maribyrnong (Vic). Bryant was replaced without comment by Philip Cutler in early July.
Terry Guthridge: originally preselected for Labor-held Melbourne Ports (Vic).
Diane Hamilton: originally preselected for Labor-held Capricornia (Qld).
Nathanael Marler: originally preselected for LNP-held Bonner (Qld).
Jim McEvoy: originally preselected for LNP-held Groom (Qld).
Linton Mudie: originally preselected for Labor-held Hindmarsh (SA).
Jimmy Ng: originally preselected for Labor-held Kingsford Smith (NSW).
Dennis Pallos: originally preselected for Labor-held Grayndler (NSW).
Matine Rahmani: originally preselected for Labor-held Bendigo (Vic). Rahmani opted to instead contest the seat as an independent.
Simon Rock: originally preselected for Independent-held Lyne (NSW).
Nataliya Shkuratova: originally preselected for Liberal-held Goldstein (Vic).
Will Tomlinson: originally preselected for National-held Gippsland (Vic).
Michael Tudman: originally preselected for LNP-held Wide Bay (Qld).
Teresa van Lieshout: originally preselected for Labor-held Fremantle (WA). Van Lieshout was disendorsed by the party in July 2013. A few days later she was endorsed by the Australian Protectionist Party.

Katter's Australian Party
Jamie Cavanough: originally preselected for Labor-held Greenway (NSW). He ran instead for the Australian Voice Party.
Tess Corbett: originally preselected for Liberal-held Wannon (Vic). Corbett withdrew from the contest in January 2013 after a furore surrounding her comments comparing homosexuality to paedophilia. She was preselected for the seat by the Australian Christians in June.
Lee Luvara: originally preselected for Liberal-held Indi (Vic).
James Martinek: originally preselected for Liberal-held Murray (Vic).
Hadley Mills: originally preselected for LNP-held Bonner (Qld).
Dennis O'Day: originally preselected for Labor-held Canberra (ACT).
Brian Watts: originally preselected for National-held O'Connor (WA).
Greg Wiszniewski: originally preselected for LNP-held McPherson (Qld).

Other parties
Stephanie Banister (One Nation): originally preselected for Labor-held Rankin, but withdrew from the election on 10 August following a gaffe-filled television interview in which she mistook Islam for a country.
Matt Darragh (Family First): originally preselected for LNP-held Flynn (Qld).
Clayton Denny (One Nation): originally preselected for Labor-held Kingston (SA).
Ron Dickinson (Australian Independents): originally preselected for Labor-held Oxley (Qld).
Anthony Fernie (Australian Independents): originally preselected for Liberal-held Gilmore (NSW).
Adrian Ford (Citizens Electoral Council): originally preselected for Labor-held Sydney (NSW).
Deanne Graf (Christian Democrats): originally preselected for Labor-held Eden-Monaro (NSW).
Barry Grant (One Nation): originally preselected for Labor-held Petrie (Qld).
Julian Grayson (Christian Democrats): originally preselected for Labor-held Charlton (NSW).
Phil Howarth (Democratic Labour): originally preselected for Labor-held Lindsay (NSW).
John Kearney (One Nation): originally preselected for CLP-held Solomon (NT).
Warren Kogler (Australian Christians): originally preselected for Labor-held Bendigo (Vic).
Tony Pettitt (Australia First): originally preselected for Liberal-held Macquarie (NSW).
Witold Wiszniewski (Christian Democrats): originally preselected for Liberal-held Bradfield (NSW).

Independent
Fernando Alba: originally running for LNP-held Bowman (Qld).
Noah Beecher Kelk: originally running for Labor-held Melbourne Ports (Vic).
Peter Bland: originally running for Labor-held McEwen (Vic).
Ray Buckley: originally running for Labor-held Eden-Monaro (NSW).
Stuart Christie: originally running for Labor-held Dobell (NSW).
Tom Ellison: originally running for Labor-held Bass (Tas).
John Green: originally running for Labor-held Gellibrand (Vic).
Bill Gupta: originally running for Labor-held Batman (Vic).
Phillip Jobson: originally running for Labor-held Makin (SA).
Alan Lappin: originally running for Liberal-held Indi (Vic). He withdrew after suffering a heart attack.
Kade Lengyel: originally running for Labor-held Isaacs (Vic).
Kimberley Maurno: originally running for Labor-held Makin (SA).
Daniel Smith: originally running for Liberal-held Gilmore (NSW).

References

External links
 Political parties registered for the 2013 federal election at the Australian Electoral Commission
 Election downloads at the Australian Electoral Commission
 Senate Group Voting Tickets at 'Australia Votes', ABC News

Candidates for Australian federal elections